Catocala longipalpis is a moth in the family Erebidae first described by Rudolf Mell in 1936. It is found in Yunnan, China.

References

longipalpis
Moths described in 1936
Moths of Asia